Michael P. Hines (September 1862 – March 14, 1910) was a 19th-century Irish born Major League Baseball catcher. He played from 1883 to 1891 and 1895 with the Boston Beaneaters, Brooklyn Grays, and Providence Grays.

External links

Baseball Almanac

1862 births
1910 deaths
19th-century baseball players
Major League Baseball catchers
Boston Beaneaters players
Brooklyn Grays players
Providence Grays players
Major League Baseball players from Ireland
Irish baseball players
Irish emigrants to the United States (before 1923)
Boston Reserves players
Charleston Seagulls players
Chattanooga Lookouts players
Charleston Quakers players
Easton (minor league baseball) players
Salem Witches players
Wilkes-Barre Barons (baseball) players
Quincy Black Birds players
Omaha Omahogs players
Omaha Lambs players
Lynn (minor league baseball) players
Salem (minor league baseball) players
Lowell (minor league baseball) players
Lewiston (minor league baseball) players